Live at Tonic may refer to:
Live at Tonic (Christian McBride album)
Live at Tonic (Marco Benevento album)

See also
Masada Live at Tonic 1999
Live at Tonic 2001, 2001 Masada album
Tonic (music venue)